Tough! is an album by drummer Art Blakey and The Jazz Messengers recorded in 1957 but not released on the Cadet label until 1966.

Reception

Allmusic awarded the album 3 stars.

Track listing 
 "Scotch Blues" (Duke Jordan) - 7:55   
 "Flight to Jordu" (Jordan) - 7:20   
 "Transfiguration" (Gigi Gryce) - 5:08   
 "Exhibit A" (Gryce) - 6:37   
 "Gershwin Medley: Rhapsody in Blue/Summertime/Someone to Watch Over Me/The Man I Love" (George Gershwin, Ira Gershwin) - 5:57

Personnel 
Art Blakey - drums
Bill Hardman - trumpet 
Jackie McLean - alto saxophone
Sam Dockery - piano
Spanky DeBrest - bass

References 

Art Blakey albums
The Jazz Messengers albums
1966 albums
Cadet Records albums